Theneeds is an online and mobile content discovery platform that helps its users discover articles, news, videos, social posts, and other media tailored to their specific interests.

Based in San Francisco, California, the company was founded in 2013 by former Accenture executives Gabriele Pansa and Luca Albertalli, together with former CS researcher and PhD Emanuele Cesena.

In early 2016, Shopkick, the most used real-world shopping app according to Nielsen, acquired the technology and team of Theneeds to support the company's personalization efforts as it continues to re-imagine the shopping experience for consumers, retailers and brands.

Service
Theneeds is designed to help users discover Internet content matching their interests. Theneeds collects information from thousands of sources including news sites, blogs, and social networks, and uses an algorithm to match content to users' interests more closely the more they use it. Keith Liles, Editor at KillerStartups wrote, "[Theneeds is] like having a fancy Internet remote control that leaves out all the boring channels."

History
The company was incorporated in the US in 2013 as Theneeds, Inc.  Gabriele Pansa, co-founder and CEO, said: “Everything started trying to keep up the topics I’m interested in. I jumped through different websites and just wasted a lot of time. The online experience is fragmented and noisy, so we thought wouldn't it be great to see just the web that matters to us? There were a bunch of solutions out there, but they were technical and boring.  We wanted to build something for the average consumer. For everyone who doesn't care about the technology behind it but just wants things that work."

Theneeds’ website launched in Beta late 2013 and the company later released also its first mobile application for iPhone in March 2014.

In September 2014 the company surpassed 10 million pieces of content delivered by its proprietary discovery engine and in October 2014 announced the release of a major improvement of its content recommendation technology.

Early 2016, Shopkick acquired Theneeds to support the company personalization efforts as it continues to re-imagine the shopping experience for consumers, retailers and brands. “With the addition of Theneeds, we are taking the next step in delivering the most valuable and contextually relevant content to our users, while offering marketers personalized, end-to-end solutions that dramatically differ from what any programmatic offering can support,” said Rask.

Technology
Theneeds’ proprietary technology is built using a mix of artificial intelligence and social signals. Theneeds creates specific thematic channels by collecting and analyzing web content, and employing Theneeds’ content relational graph along with proprietary and public social signals in order to rank and distill content. Through real-time user behavior analysis, Theneeds constantly maps the interests of each user to deliver personalized experiences and simplify content discovery.

In an article published on Inc. Magazine about the future of content discovery, Theneeds is mentioned as an example of innovative companies that are using artificial intelligence to know what users want ahead of time and bring it to them without any effort on their part.

References

Online companies of the United States
Internet properties established in 2013
2013 establishments in the United States
IOS software
Social networking websites
Recommender systems
Social information processing
2013 software
English-language mass media
Mobile social software
News aggregators